Panine alphaherpesvirus 3 (PnHV-3) is a species of virus in the genus Simplexvirus, subfamily Alphaherpesvirinae, family Herpesviridae, and order Herpesvirales.

References

External links
 

Alphaherpesvirinae